The Australian Mounted Division originally formed as the Imperial Mounted Division in January 1917, was a mounted infantry, light horse and yeomanry division. The division was formed in Egypt, and along with the Anzac Mounted Division formed part of Desert Column, Egyptian Expeditionary Force in World War I. The division was originally made up of the Australian 3rd Light Horse Brigade, (formerly Anzac Mounted Division) the reconstituted 4th Light Horse Brigade, and two British yeomanry brigades; the 5th Mounted Brigade and 6th Mounted Brigade.

History

Formation
The Imperial Mounted Division was formed in Egypt in 1917 by bringing together two Australian Light Horse brigades, two British Yeomanry brigades, and a British horse artillery brigade (four batteries). These units were:
 The 3rd Light Horse Brigade was formed in Australia in October 1914 with the 8th, 9th, and 10th Light Horse Regiments and was posted to Egypt in March 1915.  It was dismounted and served in Gallipoli from May to December attached to the New Zealand and Australian Division (notably the Battle of Sari Bair).  It joined the ANZAC Mounted Division when it was formed in March 1916 and saw action with it at the battles of Romani and Magdhaba.  It joined the division on formation in January 1917; it was replaced in the ANZAC Mounted Division by the British 22nd Mounted Brigade.
 The 4th Light Horse Brigade was formed in Australia in February 1915 with the 11th, 12th, and 13th Light Horse Regiments and was posted to Egypt in July 1915.  The brigade was broken up: the 11th Light Horse Regiment was dismounted and served in Gallipoli as reinforcements to other regiments; the 12th Light Horse Regiment was dismounted and attached to the 3rd Light Horse Brigade in Gallipoli (AugustDecember 1915) and 2nd Light Horse Brigade in Egypt (April 1915January 1917); and the 13th Light Horse Regiment remained mounted and joined the 2nd Australian Division.  The brigade was reformed in January 1917with the 4th Light Horse Regiment in place of the 13th and joined the division on formation.
 The 5th Mounted Brigade was formed as part of the Territorial Force in 1908 as the 1st South Midland Mounted Brigade with three yeomanry regiments: the Warwickshire Yeomanry, the Royal Gloucestershire Hussars and the Queen's Own Worcestershire Hussars.  Shortly after the outbreak of war, it was assigned to the 2nd Mounted Division and moved to Egypt in April 1915.  It was dismounted in August 1915 and took part in the Gallipoli Campaign as 1st Mounted Brigade, notably the Battle of Scimitar Hill.  Due to losses and wastage during August 1915, it formed a battalion sized unit1st South Midland Regimentin 1st Composite Mounted Brigade.  It returned to Egypt in December where it was reformed and remounted.  The 2nd Mounted Division was broken up in January 1916 and it served as Corps Troops from 21 January 1916 (numbered as 5th Mounted Brigade from April).  It joined the division on formation.
 The 6th Mounted Brigade was likewise formed as part of the Territorial Force in 1908 as the 2nd South Midland Mounted Brigade with three yeomanry regiments: the Royal Buckinghamshire Hussars, the Berkshire Yeomanry and the Queen's Own Oxfordshire Hussars.  On 19 September 1914, the Queen's Own Oxfordshire Hussars was posted to the BEF, joining the 4th Cavalry Brigade in France. The Queen's Own Dorset Yeomanry joined in the same month to replace them.  The brigade's early service was identical to the 5th Mounted Brigade until January 1916 when it joined the Western Frontier Force.  It joined the division on formation.
 XIX Brigade, Royal Horse Artillery (T.F.) was formed for the division in January 1917 with four British Territorial Force horse artillery batteries: the 1/1st Berkshire and 1/1st Nottinghamshire Batteries of the Royal Horse Artillery, and 1/A and 1/B Batteries of the Honourable Artillery Company.  All four batteries had originally gone out to Egypt with the 2nd Mounted Division in April 1915, but did not proceed to Gallipoli with the division.  Instead, they variously served on the Suez Canal Defences, as part of the Western Frontier Force in the Senussi Campaign, or in Aden where 1/B Battery HAC and 1/1st Berkshire RHA fought a sharp action at Sheikh Othman that removed the Turkish threat to Aden for the rest of the war.  They rejoined 2nd Mounted Division on its return from Gallipoli in December 1915, however, the dismemberment of the division began almost immediately as units were posted to the Western Frontier Force, Suez Canal Defences or to various other commands.  Initially, each battery was equipped with four Ehrhardt 15-pounder guns but were re-equipped with more modern 18 pounders (four per battery) in time for the First Battle of Gaza (2627 March 1917).  In practice, the batteries were tactically attached to the mounted brigades, for example, 1/1st Nottinghamshire RHA to the 3rd Light Horse Brigade and 1/A Battery HAC to the 4th Light Horse Brigade.
The division was also provided with support units, mostly assigned or attached directly to the brigades, but including an engineer squadron, a signals squadron, and train.

Service history
The division joined the Desert Column alongside the ANZAC Mounted Division.

During the First Battle of Gaza, the division (as the Imperial Mounted Division) provided protection from counter-attack on the eastern flank while the main infantry assault was underway.  The brigades became the rearguard during the withdrawal from Gaza after the attack was called off.

Battles
The division served in the Sinai and Palestine Campaign from formation through to the end of the First World War including
First Battle of Gaza (26 and 27 March 1917)
Second Battle of Gaza (1719 April)
Third Battle of Gaza
Battle of Beersheba (31 October)

El Maghar (13 and 14 November)
Defence against counter-attacks before Jerusalem (27 November30 December)
Second Trans-Jordan Raid (30 April4 May 1918)

The Final Offensive

Battle of Samakh (25 September)

Capture of Damascus (1 October)

Orders of battle

See also

Military history of Australia during World War I

Notes

References

Bibliography

External links
First AIF Order of Battle 1914–1918: Australian Mounted Division

Divisions of Australia in World War I
Cavalry divisions
Military units and formations established in 1917
Military units and formations disestablished in 1919